Lorne Munroe (November 24, 1924 – May 4, 2020) was an American cellist. He was principal cellist of the Philadelphia Orchestra from 1951 to 1964 and principal cellist of the New York Philharmonic from 1964 to 1996. He was a featured soloist more than 150 times during the 32 seasons he played for the New York Philharmonic. His last performance with the orchestra as a member of the ensemble was on February 27, 1996; although he later returned as a guest artist.

Early life
Munroe was born in Winnipeg, Manitoba, Canada in November 1924. When he was three years old he learned to play the cello by using a viola with a leg attached. He won the Winnipeg Music Competition festival at 10. At age 14, he was sponsored by composer Arthur Benjamin to attend the Royal College of Music in London in 1937–39. In his final year, he played with Benjamin a piece the composer wrote for Munroe. He continued his studies in Philadelphia at the Curtis Institute of Music, where he was a student of cellist Gregor Piatigorsky and Orlando Cole.

Career 
After serving in the US Army during World War II, he graduated from Curtis. In 1949, he was the sole winner of the Naumburg award and made his recital debut in New York in November of that year. In 1949-50, he performed with the Cleveland Orchestra, before taking two positions as principal cello, first with the Minneapolis Symphony Orchestra in 1950–51, and the Philadelphia Orchestra in 1951.

In 1964, he was invited by Leonard Bernstein to become the principal cellist of the New York Philharmonic. This period also saw him performing as a soloist. One such occasion was during a Young People's Concert broadcast aired Christmas Day, 1968, in a performance of Richard Strauss' Don Quixote.

He also taught at the Juilliard School and at the Philadelphia Musical Academy (now University of the Arts).

Personal life 
In 1945, he married violist Janée Munroe, with whom he had 10 sons and one daughter. Janée died September 10, 2006.

Lorne Munroe died in May 2020 at the age of 95.

References
Citations

External links
 

1924 births
2020 deaths
20th-century American musicians
20th-century Canadian male musicians
20th-century classical musicians
Canadian classical cellists
Canadian classical musicians
Canadian expatriate musicians in the United States
Curtis Institute of Music alumni
Military personnel from Philadelphia
Musicians from Winnipeg
Musicians of the Philadelphia Orchestra
University of the Arts (Philadelphia) faculty
United States Army personnel of World War II
20th-century cellists